Pasquale Sarullo was a 19th-century Franciscan friar, priest and artist. A native of Ciminna, in the province of Palermo, Italy, his work was appreciated by his contemporaries and had an international circulation.

References

Religious leaders from the Province of Palermo
19th-century Italian painters
Italian male painters
Painters from Sicily
Artists from the Province of Palermo
19th-century Italian male artists